Majid Hamid Jafar (Arabic مجيد حميد جعفر; born 1976) is an Iraqi businessman based in the UAE and the CEO of Crescent Petroleum, the Middle East's oldest privately held oil and gas company. He is vice-chairman of the Crescent Group and managing director of Dana Gas (PJSC). In 2014, he was named one of the world's 50 most influential Arabs by Middle East Magazine.

Early life and career
Majid Jafar is the eldest son of Hamid Jafar, founder of Crescent Petroleum and chairman of the Crescent Group. He is the grandson of Iraqi Dhia Jafar, politician and cabinet minister who served in the last decade of  Iraq's monarchy, during the reign of King Faisal II until 1958. The Jafar family is a notable Iraqi family that claims agnatic descent from Musa al-Kadhim.

Majid Jafar attended Eton College and graduated from Cambridge University (Churchill College) with bachelor's and master's degrees in engineering (fluid mechanics and thermodynamics). He holds a master's degree in international studies and diplomacy with distinction from the University of London's School of Oriental and African Studies (SOAS), and an MBA with distinction from Harvard Business School.

Oil and Gas career 
In his early career Jafar worked for Shell International's Exploration & Production and Gas & Power Divisions in London until 2004.

In 2004, he joined Crescent Petroleum at their headquarters in Sharjah, UAE. He became CEO of Crescent Petroleum in 2011.

Crescent Petroleum's business and exploration focus lies in the MENA region with a special focus on Egypt and Iraq, from where the Jafar family originates. In a 2018 licensing round Crescent Petroleum was awarded three concessions for gas fields in Diyala province and as well as the Khidhr Al Mai exploration block in southern Iraq.

Jafar has been named as one of the 25 most powerful people in the Middle East oil and gas sector. He is also a frequent commentator on the oil and gas sector  and energy policy and has written on the economic challenges in the Arab World, the development of the UAE and the geopolitics of oil and gas in the Caspian Region.

He was also awarded Energy CEO of 2013 by Amwal, and has been named a Young Global Leader by the World Economic Forum (WEF).

Jafar sits on the Energy Business Council of the International Energy Agency (IEA), the advisory board of the Responsible Energy Forum, and the Stewardship Board of the Global System on Energy at the World Economic Forum (WEF). He is also a member of the board of the International Advisory Council of the Atlantic Council

Jafar is also a trustee of the Arab Forum for Environment and Development (AFED)  and a board member at the Iraqi Energy Institute, a member of the Young Presidents Organisation and of the panel of senior advisors of the Royal Institute of International Affairs (Chatham House) in London chaired by former UK Prime Minister John Major.

He has repeatedly stressed the importance of the expansion of the private sector  to fully develop the potential of natural resources in the region, citing Sharjah, the UAE base of Crescent's operations, as a role model for development.

Jafar has also advocated for more balanced and sustainable energy development policy. He has championed the importance of the oil and gas industry in the low-carbon energy transition, highlighting the important role natural gas will play in tackling carbon emissions particularly in the developing world.

In 2021, Jafar announced that Crescent Petroleum became one of the first companies in the oil and gas industry to achieve carbon neutrality across its operations after completing a series of projects to reduce carbon intensity and offset remaining emissions.

Jafar was named as one of 100 inspiring leaders in the Middle East, and was listed in the top 50 of Dubai's 100: Most influential people in the Emirate, by Arabian Business. In 2017, Jafar co-chaired the WEF MENA Summit together with EU Commission President Usula von der Leyen and McKinsey managing partner Dominic Barton).

Other work 
Jafar has written columns for the Financial Times, the Daily Telegraph and HuffPost and is regularly interviewed on news channels like BBC and CNBC. In 2021, he was listed among the world's 100 most powerful Arabs and amongst the leading "Thinkers" by Arabian Business. Jafar is the founding chair of the CEG Business Council. He previously served on the Middle East Advisory board of Carnegie Endowment and Harvard Business School, and the board of the Queen Rania Foundation and is a founding patron of the Prince's Trust International in the UK. Jafar authored the opening chapter of Performance and Progress: Essays on Capitalism, Business and Society published in 2015 by Oxford University Press.

He served as the co-chair of the Business Backs Education campaign, to motivate companies to increase their CSR spending, in order to close a $26bn gap which is required to help countries offer basic schooling. The campaign was launched in cooperation with UNESCO and backed by former US President Bill Clinton and Boris Johnson.

The Jafar family has supported the Jafar Research Professorship of Petroleum Engineering at Cambridge University and the Jafar Centre for Executive Education at the American University of Sharjah. In 2015, the Jafar Hall and the Jafar Gallery were opened by the Prince of Wales at Eton College. Jafar also sits on the board of trustees at the Kalimat Foundation for Children's Empowerment.

Philanthropy 
Jafar is the Co-founder of the Loulou Foundation, which he established together with his wife to address their eldest daughter Alia's rare disease (CDKL5 Deficiency Disorder). He was a participant and speaker at the 3rd European CDKL5 Research Conference, the 4th International CDKL5 Congress and spoke at the EURORDIS Summit in Vienna in May 2018.

With the Loulou Foundation the Jafars have supported the research of over 120 scientists at universities in Europe and the United States. Until 2018, the foundation supported 31 projects in 41 laboratories at 30 different institutions. Jafar and his wife were honored at the 2017 Finding A Cure for Epilepsy and Seizures (FACES) Gala in New York for their contributions to research towards better treatments for children who have epileptic seizures and other chronic conditions.

In 2020 the Jafars also established an endowed scholarship at Harvard Medical School to support medical students from the Middle East region. Jafar is a member of the Board of Fellows and the Discovery Council of Harvard Medical School.

Personal life
Jafar is married to Lynn Barghout Jafar, daughter of businessman and philanthropist Bassam Barghout who was awarded the Order of the Cedar with rank of Knight by the President and Prime Minister of Lebanon for his services to the country. Her grandfather  Khalil Al-Hibri served as a member of parliament, Chairman of the Water Board of Beirut, Minister of Public Works and then Prime Minister of Lebanon in 1958, heading the transitional government in response to the Lebanon Crisis. Her great-grandfather was Sheikh Toufik El-Hibri, a founder of the Scout movement in Lebanon and across the Arab World.

Majid and Lynn Jafar have three children (two girls and 1 boy).Lynn Barghout Jafar founded and manages High Hopes Dubai, a pediatric therapy center, which was opened in November 2017 by HRH Princess Haya bint Hussein.

References

1976 births
Living people
Alumni of Churchill College, Cambridge
Alumni of SOAS University of London
Emirati businesspeople
Emirati chief executives
Emirati engineers
Emirati people of Iraqi descent
Harvard Business School alumni
Harvard Medical School people
People educated at Eton College
Petroleum engineers